Prospekt Bolshevikov is a station on the Line 4 of Saint Petersburg Metro, opened on December 30, 1985.

Transport 
Buses: 12, 102, 118, 140, 161, 164, 169, 191, 255A, 255Б, 264, 268, 288. Trolleybuses: 28, 33, 43. Trams: 10, 27, 65, A. Minibuses: K-801, K-801A.

Saint Petersburg Metro stations
Railway stations in Russia opened in 1985
1985 establishments in the Soviet Union
Railway stations located underground in Russia